This is a partial list of Pakistani films scheduled to release in 2016:

Highest-grossing films

The top 10 films released in 2016 by worldwide gross are as follows:

Background color  indicates the current releases

Events

Award ceremonies

Releases

January – April

May – August

September - December

See also
2016 in Pakistan

References

External links
 Search Pakistani film - IMDB.com

2016
Lists of 2016 films by country or language
Films